Jamania is a village in Pilibhit district, Uttar Pradesh, India. 
geographical coordinates: 28° 39' 0" North, 80° 3' 0" East

Villages in Pilibhit district